"Az én apám" (English: My father) is a song by Hungarian singer Joci Pápai. It represented Hungary in the Eurovision Song Contest 2019 in Tel Aviv, Israel. The song is a mid-tempo ballad about Pápai's childhood memories. It runs at 96 BPM and has elements from Hungarian folk music. The song did not gain enough points to qualify for the final.

Eurovision Song Contest

The song was selected to represent Hungary in the 2019 Eurovision Song Contest. It was chosen in the 2019 series of A Dal, Hungary's national selection process for the Eurovision Song Contest. On 28 January 2019, a special allocation draw was held which placed each country into one of the two semi-finals, as well as which half of the show they would perform in. Hungary was placed into the first semi-final, to be held on 14 May 2019, and was scheduled to perform in the first half of the show. Once all the competing songs for the 2019 contest had been released, the running order for the semi-finals was decided by the show's producers rather than through another draw, so that similar songs were not placed next to each other. Hungary performed in position 7. Hungary failed to gain enough points to place in the top ten and failed to qualify for the final for the first time since 2010 (when Hungary did not compete).

Track listing

Charts

References

Eurovision songs of Hungary
Eurovision songs of 2019
2018 songs
2019 singles
Pop ballads
Joci Pápai songs